In physical cosmology, the baryon asymmetry problem, also known as the matter asymmetry problem or the matter–antimatter asymmetry problem, is the observed imbalance in baryonic matter (the type of matter experienced in everyday life) and antibaryonic matter in the observable universe. Neither the standard model of particle physics nor the theory of general relativity provides a known explanation for why this should be so, and it is a natural assumption that the universe is neutral with all conserved charges. The Big Bang should have produced equal amounts of matter and antimatter. Since this does not seem to have been the case, it is likely some physical laws must have acted differently or did not exist for matter and antimatter. Several competing hypotheses exist to explain the imbalance of matter and antimatter that resulted in baryogenesis. However, there is as of yet no consensus theory to explain the phenomenon, which has been described as "one of the great mysteries in physics".

Sakharov conditions

In 1967, Andrei Sakharov proposed a set of three necessary conditions that a baryon-generating interaction must satisfy to produce matter and antimatter at different rates. These conditions were inspired by the recent discoveries of the cosmic background radiation and CP violation in the neutral kaon system. The three necessary "Sakharov conditions" are:
 Baryon number  violation.
 C-symmetry and CP-symmetry violation.
 Interactions out of thermal equilibrium.

Baryon number violation
Baryon number violation is a necessary condition to produce an excess of baryons over anti-baryons. But C-symmetry violation is also needed so that the interactions which produce more baryons than anti-baryons will not be counterbalanced by interactions which produce more anti-baryons than baryons. CP-symmetry violation is similarly required because otherwise equal numbers of left-handed  baryons and right-handed anti-baryons would be produced, as well as equal numbers of left-handed anti-baryons and right-handed baryons. Finally, the interactions must be out of thermal equilibrium, since otherwise CPT symmetry would assure compensation between processes increasing and decreasing the baryon number.

Currently, there is no experimental evidence of particle interactions where the conservation of baryon number is broken perturbatively: this would appear to suggest that all observed particle reactions have equal baryon number before and after. Mathematically, the commutator of the baryon number quantum operator with the (perturbative) Standard Model hamiltonian is zero: . However, the Standard Model is known to violate the conservation of baryon number only non-perturbatively: a global U(1) anomaly. To account for baryon violation in baryogenesis, such events (including proton decay) can occur in Grand Unification Theories (GUTs) and supersymmetric (SUSY) models via hypothetical massive bosons such as the X boson.

CP-symmetry violation

The second condition for generating baryon asymmetry—violation of charge-parity symmetry—is that a process is able to happen at a different rate to its antimatter counterpart. In the Standard Model, CP violation appears as a complex phase in the quark mixing matrix of the weak interaction. There may also be a non-zero CP-violating phase in the neutrino mixing matrix, but this is currently unmeasured. The first in a series of basic physics principles to be violated was parity through Chien-Shiung Wu's experiment. This led to CP violation being verified in the 1964 Fitch–Cronin experiment with neutral kaons, which resulted in the 1980 Nobel Prize in physics (direct CP violation, that is violation of CP symmetry in a decay process, was discovered later, in 1999). Due to CPT symmetry, violation of CP symmetry demands violation of time inversion symmetry, or T-symmetry. Despite the allowance for CP violation in the Standard Model, it is insufficient to account for the observed baryon asymmetry of the universe (BAU) given the limits on baryon number violation, meaning that beyond-Standard Model sources are needed.

A possible new source of CP violation was found at the Large Hadron Collider (LHC) by the LHCb collaboration during the first three years of LHC operations (beginning March 2010). The experiment analyzed the decays of two particles, the bottom Lambda (Λb0) and its antiparticle, and compared the distributions of decay products. The data showed an asymmetry of up to 20% of CP-violation sensitive quantities, implying a breaking of CP-symmetry. This analysis will need to be confirmed by more data from subsequent runs of the LHC.

Interactions out of thermal equilibrium
In the out-of-equilibrium decay scenario, the last condition states that the rate of a reaction which generates baryon-asymmetry must be less than the rate of expansion of the universe. In this situation the particles and their corresponding antiparticles do not achieve thermal equilibrium due to rapid expansion decreasing the occurrence of pair-annihilation.

Other explanations

Regions of the universe where antimatter dominates
Another possible explanation of the apparent baryon asymmetry is that matter and antimatter are essentially separated into different, widely distant regions of the universe. The formation of antimatter galaxies was originally thought to explain the baryon asymmetry, as from a distance, antimatter atoms are indistinguishable from matter atoms; both produce light (photons) in the same way. Along the boundary between matter and antimatter regions, however, annihilation (and the subsequent production of gamma radiation) would be detectable, depending on its distance and the density of matter and antimatter. Such boundaries, if they exist, would likely lie in deep intergalactic space. The density of matter in intergalactic space is reasonably well established at about one atom per cubic meter. Assuming this is a typical density near a boundary, the gamma ray luminosity of the boundary interaction zone can be calculated. No such zones have been detected, but 30 years of research have placed bounds on how far they might be. On the basis of such analyses, it is now deemed unlikely that any region within the observable universe is dominated by antimatter.

Electric dipole moment
The presence of an electric dipole moment (EDM) in any fundamental particle would violate both parity (P) and time (T) symmetries. As such, an EDM would allow matter and antimatter to decay at different rates leading to a possible matter–antimatter asymmetry as observed today. Many experiments are currently being conducted to measure the EDM of various physical particles. All measurements are currently consistent with no dipole moment. However, the results do place rigorous constraints on the amount of symmetry violation that a physical model can permit. The most recent EDM limit, published in 2014, was that of the ACME Collaboration, which measured the EDM of the electron using a pulsed beam of thorium monoxide (ThO) molecules.

Mirror anti-universe

The state of the universe, as it is, does not violate the CPT symmetry, because the Big Bang could be considered as a double sided event, both classically and quantum mechanically, consisting of a universe-antiuniverse pair. This means that this universe is the charge (C), parity (P) and time (T) image of the anti-universe. This pair emerged from the Big Bang epochs not directly into a hot, radiation-dominated era. The antiuniverse would flow back in time from the Big Bang, becoming bigger as it does so, and would be also dominated by antimatter. Its spatial properties are inverted if compared to those in our universe, a situation analogous to creating electron–positron pairs in a vacuum. This model, devised by physicists from the Perimeter Institute for Theoretical Physics in Canada, proposes that temperature fluctuations in the cosmic microwave background (CMB) are due to the quantum-mechanical nature of space-time near the Big Bang singularity. This means that a point in the future of our universe and a point in the distant past of the antiuniverse would provide fixed classical points, while all possible quantum-based permutations would exist in between. Quantum uncertainty causes the universe and antiuniverse to not be exact mirror images of each other.

This model has not shown if it can reproduce certain observations regarding the inflation scenario, such as explaining the uniformity of the cosmos on large scales. However, it provides a natural and straightforward explanation for dark matter. Such a universe-antiuniverse pair would produce large numbers of superheavy neutrinos, also known as sterile neutrinos. These neutrinos might also be the source of recently observed bursts of high-energy cosmic rays.

Baryon asymmetry parameter
The challenges to the physics theories are then to explain how to produce the predominance of matter over antimatter, and also the magnitude of this asymmetry. An important quantifier is the asymmetry parameter,

This quantity relates the overall number density difference between baryons and antibaryons (nB and n, respectively) and the number density of cosmic background radiation photons nγ.

According to the Big Bang model, matter decoupled from the cosmic background radiation (CBR) at a temperature of roughly  kelvin, corresponding to an average kinetic energy of  / = . After the decoupling, the total number of CBR photons remains constant. Therefore, due to space-time expansion, the photon density decreases. The photon density at equilibrium temperature T per cubic centimeter, is given by

with kB as the Boltzmann constant, ħ as the Planck constant divided by 2 and c as the speed of light in vacuum, and ζ(3) as Apéry's constant.

Therefore, the asymmetry parameter η, as defined above, is not the "good" parameter. Instead, the preferred asymmetry parameter uses the entropy density s,

because the entropy density of the universe remained reasonably constant throughout most of its evolution. The entropy density is

with p and ρ as the pressure and density from the energy density tensor Tμν, and g* as the effective number of degrees of freedom for "massless" particles (inasmuch as mc2 ≪ kBT holds) at temperature T,
,
for bosons and fermions with gi and gj degrees of freedom at temperatures Ti and Tj respectively. Presently, s = .

See also

 Baryogenesis
 CP violation
 List of unsolved problems in physics

References

Astrophysics
Unsolved problems in physics
Asymmetry
Antimatter